This is a list of the National Register of Historic Places listings in Fannin County, Texas.

This is intended to be a complete list of properties and districts listed on the National Register of Historic Places in Fannin County, Texas. There are one National Historic Landmark, one district, six individual properties, and one former property listed on the National Register in the county. The National Historic Landmark is also a State Historic Site, a State Antiquities Landmark, and a Recorded Texas Historic Landmark while three additional individually listed properties are also Recorded Texas Historic Landmarks.

Current listings

The locations of National Register properties and districts may be seen in a mapping service provided.

|}

Former listing

|}

See also

National Register of Historic Places listings in Texas
Recorded Texas Historic Landmarks in Fannin County

References

External links

Registered Historic Places
Fannin County
Buildings and structures in Fannin County, Texas